Charlotte Sarah Emily Vere, Baroness Vere of Norbiton (born 9 March 1969) is a British Conservative politician and member of the House of Lords. She serves also as a Parliamentary Under-Secretary of State in the Department for Transport and was executive director of the Girls' Schools Association from 2013 to 2016.

Education
Vere is the eldest daughter of Colonel Roger Vere and of Karin Terry. She was educated at Stover School, University College London (BSc, 1989) and at the Kellogg School of Management at Northwestern University (MBA, 1997).

Political career
She was the Conservative candidate in the constituency of Brighton Pavilion at the 2010 general election. She finished third with 23.7 percent of the vote.

She served as a director of the "No to alternative voting" campaign during the UK's 2011 referendum on changing its voting system, later working as executive director of 'Conservatives In', an unsuccessful campaign supporting a remain vote in the 2016 European Union membership referendum.

She was nominated for a life peerage in the 2016 Prime Minister's Resignation Honours and was created Baroness Vere of Norbiton, of Norbiton in the Royal London Borough of Kingston upon Thames, on 30 August 2016.

On 21 December 2016, she was appointed as a Baroness in Waiting (i.e. government whip in the House of Lords) until 29 July 2019.

Department for Transport
She became a Parliamentary Under-Secretary of State in the Department for Transport on 23 April 2019. 

Following changes in the Sunak ministry, on 2 November 2022, she became minister for shipping (maritime) in the Department for Transport. At the same time, she was confirmed as the Government transport spokesperson in House of Lords, with responsibility for aviation, space and local transport, including buses.

See also
Lord Vere of Hanworth

References

1969 births
Living people
Alumni of University College London
Kellogg School of Management alumni
Conservative Party (UK) life peers
Life peeresses created by Elizabeth II